The Valley of the Devil (Italian: La valle del diavolo) is a 1943 Italian historical drama film directed by Mario Mattoli and starring Marina Berti, Carlo Ninchi and Andrea Checchi. It was shot at the Palatino Studios in Rome. The film's sets were designed by the art director Piero Filippone and Mario Rappini.

Cast
 Marina Berti as Greta Hansel
 Carlo Ninchi as Il capitano medico Hansel
 Andrea Checchi as Il tenente medico Peter Grundel
 Osvaldo Valenti as Il barone Rider
 Ada Dondini as Zia Frida
 Nino Pavese as Stefano, il maggiordomo
 Gildo Bocci as Il postiglione
 Tino Scotti as Olaf, il marinaio attendente
 Carlo Duse

References

Bibliography
 Parish, Robert. Film Actors Guide. Scarecrow Press, 1977.

External links

1943 films
1940s Italian-language films
Italian black-and-white films
Films directed by Mario Mattoli
Italian historical drama films
1940s historical drama films
Films set in the 19th century
1943 drama films
Films shot at Palatino Studios
1940s Italian films